William Watkin (fl. 1558) was an English politician.

Family
Watkin's identity is not known. He may have been the son of Lewis Watkins, MP for Pembroke in 1545, although Bindoff considers this unlikely.

Career
Watkin was a Member (MP) of the Parliament of England for Pembroke Boroughs in 1558.

References

Year of birth unknown
Year of death unknown
English MPs 1558